Leonard Mark Dugan (February 19, 1910 – June 20, 1967) was an American football player who played four seasons in the National Football League with the New York Giants, Chicago Cardinals and Pittsburgh Pirates. He played college football at Wichita State University and attended McCracken High School in McCracken, Kansas.

References

External links
Just Sports Stats

1910 births
1967 deaths
Players of American football from Kansas
American football centers
American football linebackers
Wichita State Shockers football players
New York Giants players
Chicago Cardinals players
Pittsburgh Pirates (football) players
People from Osborne County, Kansas